Khormaksar District (Br.Eng. [kəˈmæksə],Arabic: خورمكسر [χɔːɾˈmaksaɾ]) is a district of the Aden Governorate, Yemen. As of 2003, the district had a population of 47,044 inhabitants.

History

As part of Aden Colony Khormaksar was a military base for the British forces who built multiple barracks in the area. Its importance strengthened further after the Royal Air Force moved to the district in 1927. They constructed airports and some military camps to accommodate the Air Force soldiers.

After World War II Khormaksar was planned and built according to the modern English-style with all the necessary facilities. Further more, the Military Airport was renovated and a new airport was constructed which is known today as Aden International Airport. This was followed by the construction of several wooden houses, some of which consists of two floors and some other one-story English style houses and constructed Elizabeth II Hospital which was hospital in Aden.

At the end of the 1950s Al-Shabat (from English "the shops") area was constructed in the district. It consisted of a number of large apartment buildings, new streets were paved and all supporting facilities such as schools, public colleges, public parks, casinos and discothèques, cinemas and hotels were built. They were all built to serve the soldiers in the British Military Base of East Suez. Therefore, Khormaksar district became one of the best neighborhoods of modern-style homes to the British soldiers and British officers. Public services like water, electricity, telecommunications and sewage has been completed and renewed at the beginning of the 1960s and the number of military camps in Khormaksar was expanded to seven fully equipped camps.

References

Districts of Aden Governorate
Aden Governorate